United Overseas Bank Plaza (UOB Plaza) is a  complex with twin tower late-modernist skyscrapers in the city of Singapore.  UOB Plaza One was one of the three tallest in the city, sharing the title with the OUB Centre and Republic Plaza, but it is now the second tallest since the construction of Tanjong Pagar Centre in 2016. UOB Plaza Two is a shorter and older building with construction completed in 1973 and was later renovated in 1995 with a similar facade as UOB Plaza One. Both buildings are connected by a  podium supported by four columns. The podium houses the banking hall of the United Overseas Bank's main branch. The building was opened by then Senior Minister Lee Kuan Yew on 6 August 1995 which was 60 years after the founding of the United Overseas Bank.

Description
There are two buildings that make up the Plaza, which are divided into the high-rise "Plaza 1 (UOB Plaza One)" and the low-rise "Plaza (UOB Plaza Two)".

UOB Plaza One 
It is on Raffles Place, Singapore's Central Business District, along the Singapore River. Completed in 1992, it is a box-shaped post-modernism building which was designed by Kenzo Tange, a renowned Japanese architect, and was constructed by Nishimatsu Construction and Lum Chang JV.

Built as the head office of the United Overseas Bank, one of Singapore's leading banks, the building was also one of the country's tallest skyscrapers along with the adjoining OUB Center and Republic Plaza until it was succeeded by the Tanjong Pagar Centre.

The materials, colors, shapes and overall image of the building closely resembles the Tokyo Metropolitan Government Building, which was completed in Shinjuku, Tokyo in 1990 which was also designed by Kenzo Tange.

UOB Plaza Two / UOB Pla2a 
It was first completed in 1973 before it was remodeled in 1995. The extension and renovation of the building, which was completed in 1993, saw the addition of 8 new floors. The building was on the site of the former Bonham Building, which housed the former United Chinese Bank (now the United Overseas Bank). That structure was named UOB Building upon completion, before adopting its current name in 1965.

Gallery

See also
 Tallest buildings in Singapore
 List of tallest freestanding steel structures
 Robot Building (UOB Bangkok headquarters)

References

Further reading
 '

External links

Downtown Core (Singapore)
Office buildings completed in 1974
Office buildings completed in 1992
Skyscraper office buildings in Singapore
Raffles Place
20th-century architecture in Singapore